is an autobahn in Germany.

The A 485 is an eastern bypass of the town of Gießen. Between junctions 1 and 7, it is the eastern leg of the Gießener Ring.

The A 485 is one of two completed portions of an abandoned plan to extend the A 49 to Darmstadt. The other portion is the A 661 from junction 8 onwards.

Junction 1 is split into three parts. Heading northbound, the first part that is encountered is a trumpet interchange with the B 3a freeway. The B 3a continues northbound, while A 485 traffic is required to exit the freeway to the right. After exiting, the A 485 continues on a shorter stretch of freeway, passing the Marburger Straße junction before ending at a trumpet with the A 480. All three parts are signed as junction 1, and both trumpets are named Gießener Nordkreuz.

Exit list

 

 

 
 exit from  northbound only, no entrance
 

 

 

 
Freeway continues as the B 3 towards Frankfurt am Main
|}

External links
 Autobahn Atlas: A485

485